The Old Stone Tavern, near Frankfort, Kentucky, is a historic stone building that once served as an inn and tavern on a stagecoach line, and later served as a toll house.  It was listed on the National Register of Historic Places in 1983.

It is a one-and-three-quarters-story hall-parlor plan structure that is the primary structure remaining out of an old inn complex.

It is located on the Old Leestown Pike the corner of Scruggs Lane.

A former blacksmith site is behind the house.

See also 
 Gaines Tavern History Center: Walton, Kentucky
 Old Talbott Tavern: Bardstown, Kentucky
 Sherman Tavern: Sherman, Kentucky
 National Register of Historic Places listings in Franklin County, Kentucky

References

National Register of Historic Places in Frankfort, Kentucky
Greek Revival architecture in Kentucky
Hotel buildings on the National Register of Historic Places in Kentucky
Drinking establishments on the National Register of Historic Places in Kentucky
Toll houses on the National Register of Historic Places
Hall-parlor plan architecture in the United States
Taverns in the United States